King's worm lizard (Amphisbaena kingii) is a species of worm lizard in the family Amphisbaenidae. The species is endemic to South America.

Etymology
The specific name, kingii, is in honor of Australian marine surveyor Philip Parker King.

Geographic range
A. kingii is found in Argentina, Bolivia, Brazil, and Uruguay.

Description
Dorsally, it is purplish brown. Ventrally, it is whitish.

Reproduction
A. kingii is oviparous.

References

Further reading
Bell T (1833). "[Characters of two New Genera of Reptiles]". Proceedings of the Zoological Society of London 1833: 98–99. (Anops kingii, new species, p. 99). (in English and Latin).
Duméril AMC, Bibron G (1839). Erpétologie générale ou Histoire naturelle complète des Reptiles. Tome cinquième [Volume 5]. Paris: Roret. viii + 854 pp. (Amphisbæna kingii, new combination, pp. 496–498). (in French).
Gans C (2005). "Checklist and Bibliography of the Amphisbaenia of the World". Bulletin of the American Museum of Natural History (289): 1–130. (Anops kingii, p. 22).
Stejneger L (1916). "Notes on Amphisbænian Nomenclature". Proceedings of the Biological Society of Washington 29: 85. (Anopsibæna kingii, new combination).

Amphisbaena (lizard)
Reptiles described in 1833
Taxa named by Thomas Bell (zoologist)